The International Emergency Management Organization is an international body having its provisional head office in Italy. It was established through the Inter-governmental Convention on food micro-algae, university research and emergency prevention, first ratified by Benin, Madagascar, and Somalia.

Activities
IEMO is involved in emergency management and prevention. It organizes an International Emergency Prevention Day on 14 April 2012.

References

External links

IEMO official website
CISRI official website
CISRI-ISP official website

Emergency management